The 1990 Australian Drivers' Championship was an Australian motor racing title sanctioned by the Confederation of Australian Motor Sport and open to Formula Holden racing cars. It was the 34th Australian Drivers' Championship and the second to be contested by Formula Holden cars. The championship winner was awarded the CAMS Gold Star.

The championship was won by Simon Kane driving a Ralt RT21.

Calendar
The championship was contested over eight rounds with one race per round.

Teams and drivers
The following teams and drivers competed in the 1990 Australian Drivers' Championship.

Notes
 All Formula Holden cars were required to use a Holden V6 engine.
 Australian Formula 2 cars were invited to compete in the final three rounds to boost competitor numbers.

Points system
Championship points were awarded on a 9–6–4–3–2–1 basis to the first six finishers at each round. Each driver could retain only his/her best seven results, any other points being discarded.

Championship standings

References

External links
 Australian Drivers’ Championship – CAMS Gold Star, docs.cams.com.au, as archived at web.archive.org

Australian Drivers' Championship
Drivers' Championship
Formula Holden